An election was held on November 8, 2022, to elect all 160 members to the Massachusetts House of Representatives. The election coincided with elections for other offices, including governor, and U.S. House of Representatives. The Massachusetts Democratic Party retained a supermajority in the chamber.

Predictions

Overview

Election

Summary of Results by State House District 
Bold text denotes a gain for a party.

See also 

 2022 Massachusetts general election
 2022 Massachusetts Senate election
 2019–2020 Massachusetts legislature
 2021–2022 Massachusetts legislature

Notes

References 

Massachusetts House
State House
Massachusetts House of Representatives elections